Rumelyana Boncheva Stefanova (Bulgarian: Румеляна Бончева; born 25 April 1957 in Varna) is a Bulgarian former rower who competed in the 1980 Summer Olympics.

References

External links
 

1957 births
Living people
Bulgarian female rowers
Olympic rowers of Bulgaria
Rowers at the 1980 Summer Olympics
Olympic bronze medalists for Bulgaria
Olympic medalists in rowing
Medalists at the 1980 Summer Olympics
World Rowing Championships medalists for Bulgaria
Sportspeople from Varna, Bulgaria